The association football competition at the 2002 Central American and Caribbean Games was held between 23 November and 7 December 2007, although qualification took place beforehand. El Salvador, the tournament's host, drew with Mexico in the final 1–1, eventually defeating Mexico in a penalty shoot-out 4–3, winning its second title and the first title since 1954.

Participants 

Twelve nations participated in the tournament, and all of the teams sent were each nation's U-21 team. Cuba withdrew and was replaced by the Dominican Republic. Ten of the teams which participated were from CONCACAF with the remaining two being from CONMEBOL.

CONCACAF (10)
 
 
  (withdrew)
  (replaced Cuba)
  (hosts)
 
 
 
 
 
 

CONMEBOL (2)

Medal winners

Venues

Squads

Preliminary round

Group 1

Group 2

Group 3

Group 4

Final round

Bracket

Quarterfinals

Semifinals

Third place match

Final

Statistics

Goalscorers

Final rankings

References

External links 

Central American and Caribbean Games 2002 (El Salvador)
Central American and Caribbean Games 2002 (El Salvador) – Details

 
2002 Central American and Caribbean Games
2002
CEn
2002